Bengt Fredrik Lindberg (born 2 February 1986) is a Swedish curler from Karlstad. Lindberg grew up in Östersund.

From 2006 until 2008 he played both Third and Second positions for Sebastian Kraupp. In 2009 he and Kraupp joined Niklas Edin's team with Lindberg throwing Second stones.

At their first major tournament, the 2009 Aberdeen European Championships, Fredrik Lindberg and his team pulled off several upsets against established senior teams including reigning 2009 World Bronze Medalists Team Ulsrud from Norway. They lost just two matches in the round robin portion and went on to win both of their Playoff matches defeating Team Switzerland in the Gold Medal match.

Lindberg and his team represented Sweden at the 2010 Winter Olympics in Vancouver, British Columbia, Canada where they placed fourth.

Since the 2010 Olympics, the Edin team won the 2013 Ford World Men's Curling Championship, the 2012 European Curling Championships, won silver at the 2011 European Curling Championships and bronze medals at the 2011 and 2012 World Curling Championships.

In 2011 he was inducted into the Swedish Curling Hall of Fame.

Coaching career
After his retirement from curling to focus on his relationship with fellow curler Alison Kreviazuk in 2014, he remained a part of team Edin, but now as the official team coach. Peja Lindholm then became the Swedish national coach.

Teammates
2009 Aberdeen European Championships

2010 Vancouver Olympic Games

Niklas Edin, Skip

Sebastian Kraupp, Third

Viktor Kjäll, Lead

Oskar Eriksson, Alternate

References

External links
 
 Curlit biography

Swedish male curlers
Living people
Curlers at the 2010 Winter Olympics
Curlers at the 2014 Winter Olympics
Olympic bronze medalists for Sweden
Olympic curlers of Sweden
1986 births
Sportspeople from Karlstad
World curling champions
European curling champions
Swedish curling champions
Medalists at the 2014 Winter Olympics
Olympic medalists in curling
Medalists at the 2007 Winter Universiade
Swedish curling coaches
Universiade medalists in curling
Universiade gold medalists for Sweden
Universiade bronze medalists for Sweden
Competitors at the 2007 Winter Universiade
Competitors at the 2009 Winter Universiade
21st-century Swedish people